2021 census may refer to:

2021 Australian census
2021 Canadian census
2021 Czech census
2021 Greek census
2021 Population Census in Hong Kong
2021 Census of India
2021 Nepal census
2021 Census Russia
2021 United Kingdom census